Edward Lee "Ed" Montgomery (born February 1, 1952) is an American author, motivational speaker, gospel musician, and pianist, who is the founder and pastor of Abundant Life Center For Dynamic Living in Houston, Texas.

He started his music career in 2000 with the release of, Show Me the Money, by his own label, Ablife Records. The album, I Still Believe, was released in 2000, again by Ablife Records. This album would chart on two Billboard charts Gospel Albums and Independent Albums. His 2002 album, Total Live Experience, was released by Ablife Records. The album charted on the two aforementioned charts, along with placing on the Heatseekers Albums chart.

Ed Montgomery is also the author of several books, including Heaven in Your Heart: And in Your Pocket Too (Charisma Media, December 1998), Breaking the Spirit of Poverty (Charisma House, March 1999)and When Heaven Is Silent (Creation House, June 2002), all available on Amazon.

Early life
Montgomery was born in Cleveland, Ohio, on February 1, 1952, as Edward Lee Montgomery, the son of James Edward Montgomery and Betty Lou Montgomery, yet he was reared by his grandmother, Iola Freeman, in the church at Temple Baptist Church, where he acquired the ability to play the piano.

Music career
His music career commenced in 2000, with the album, Show Me the Money, that was released on January 4, 2000, by his own label Ablife Record. He released, I Still Believe, on November 20, 2000, by Ablife Records, and this placed on two Billboard charts Gospel Albums at No. 11 and Independent Albums at No. 41. The 2002 album, Total Live Experience, was released on July 23, 2002 by Ablife Records, and this charted on the two aforementioned charts at Nos. 7 and 22 respectively, which it also got a placement on the Heatseekers Albums chart at No. 34.

Personal life
Montgomery is married to Dr. Saundra Elaine Montgomery, a Clevelander in her own right, and together they reside in Houston, Texas, where they are the pastors of Abundant Life Center (Abundant Life Cathedral).  They have three children: two sons, Edward Lee Montgomery II, Simeon Raphael Montgomery, and a daughter, Angela Renee Montgomery, who died of cancer at age 14.

Discography

References

External links
 Official website

American motivational speakers
Living people
African-American songwriters
1952 births
African-American Christians
Musicians from Cleveland
Musicians from Houston
Songwriters from Ohio
Songwriters from Texas
Life coaches
21st-century African-American people
20th-century African-American people